Edward Hutchinson Brown (24 April 1881 – after 1904) was an English footballer who made 37 appearances in the Football League playing for Lincoln City as a forward.

References

1881 births
Year of death missing
Footballers from Sunderland
English footballers
Association football forwards
Lincoln City F.C. players
English Football League players
Place of death missing